Gaëtan de Grimaudet de Rochebouët (1813–1899) was a French general who served as Prime Minister for less than a month in late 1877.

On 29 June 1877, Patrice de MacMahon dissolved the House after being outvoted. The elections of 14 October 1877 were a victory for Republicans, who won a majority of seats. President MacMahon at first attempted to resist the result. He asked General Rochebouet to form a "department of business", with which the House refused to deal: Rochebouet resigned less than 24 hours after his appointment.  MacMahon decided to accept the conditions of Jules Dufaure, forming a new, left of center government.

Rochebouët's Ministry, 23 November 1877 – 13 December 1877
 Gaëtan de Grimaudet de Rochebouët – President of the Council and Minister of War
 Marquis de Banneville – Minister of Foreign Affairs
 Charles Welche – Minister of the Interior
 François Dutilleul – Minister of Finance
 François Le Pelletier – Minister of Justice
 Albert Roussin – Minister of Marine and Colonies
 Hervé Faye – Minister of Public Instruction, Fine Arts, and Worship
 Michel Graëff – Minister of Public Works
 Jules Ozenne – Minister of Agriculture and Commerce

References

1813 births
1899 deaths
People from Angers
École Polytechnique alumni
French untitled nobility
Grand Officiers of the Légion d'honneur
Politicians of the French Third Republic
French Ministers of War
Prime Ministers of France